The Radiotelevisão Caboverdiana is Cape Verde's first radio and television station broadcasting local programs from Cape Verde, Portugal and Brazil as well as the rest of the world especially France. It is a publicly owned company and enterprise and is located in the Capeverdean capital city of Praia, in the southern part in the middle of Achada Santo António RTC also has a few buildings, it also has offices in São Vicente (serving the northwestern part), Sal (serving the northeastern part), São Filipe on Fogo Island (serving the southwestern part) and Assomada in Santa Catarina (serving Northern Santiago and possibly Maio). The building size is very small.  The radio building is in the south on Rua 13 de Janeiro and the television station is in the north.  Its current president is José Emanuel Tavares Moreira.

The station also broadcasts news, sports, television shows and recently broadcasts football or soccer coverages from Portugal and also from Brazil as well as Latin America but rarely around the world.  The radio channel is branded as RCV, originally broadcast during the later part of the day and the evening in its early years and then most of the day and the evening, now it is a 24-hour radio station. The TV channel is branded as TCV and it is also available in Portugal in the principal cable and IPTV platforms as a premium channel under the name TCV Internacional.  As of the late 2000s, TCV broadcast from noon to midnight.  The first and only youth radion station is known as RCV+, Radio Cabo Verde Jovem which broadcasts from 7 AM until 10 PM.

History and information

Radio
The radio services in Cape Verde began in the 1930s making it the first in the nation, first known as Rádio Colonial Portuguesa (Portuguese Colonial Radio, equivalent to RDP in what were its colonies), it began broadcasting news, sporting events including soccer games from the nation and Cape Verde.  After independence from Portugal on July 5, 1975, its overseas section of RDP was no more and radio broadcasts as RCV began. Years later, more radio affiliates were made on other islands, one of the stations was Rádio Voz de São Vicente.

Decades before TCV
The first transmissions of television in Cape Verde began under the name Televisão Experimental de Cabo Verde or TEVEC, it started on March 12, 1975, less than four months before independence and started operating on December 31 later in the year.  It had 22 professionals and broadcast three shows a week for several hours.

Over the years, TEVEC grew and increased its frequencies and transmissions.

Some years before the foundation, poet Corsino Fortes, then Deputy Secretary to the Prime Minister and titular Minister of Social Communications, inspired a television model of Iceland in which television stations existed and operated in small cities and proved the experimental mode for the country's model.  The model worked even in its early ears, below and above.  In some shows, the signals abruptively interrupted.

On June 1, 1990, the name TNCV (Televisão Nacional CaboVerdiana) marked a new era in Capeverdean television and no longer became experimental, it consolidated the idea of a national television that reflects culture and the making by its people.  A second studio started construction and added several operators and capacitors began.

Later history
On August 1, 1997, a television channel were added and is the first in all of Cape Verde and broadcast a few programs, sporting events, documentaries and more.  Until 1997, Cape Verde was one of several nations that did not have a television channel, up to around the mid-1990s, television was non-existent in the country.  The network was founded in May 1997 by the Minister of Social Communications José António dos Reis.  It merged with Radio Nacional de Cabo Verde (RNCV) and Televisião Nacional CaboVerdiana (TNCV).

The network was the first to broadcast elections, the 2001 federal elections, parliamentary and the presidential.

It had broadcast the World Cup games in which is one of the few international games seen, there were no international coverages except for the African sporting events until the 2000s. The network also broadcasts the FIBA World Championship games.

Recent history
It was the sole broadcasting television station and later the main station until March 31, 2008, when Record Cabo Verde started its broadcast.

A few of its programs are being aired on TV CPLP, a television station aired in lusophony countries.

Accords and protocols
Accords and protocols were made over the years.  The first accord was with Radiodifusão Portuguesa in 2001 followed by Cubavisión in 2003 and an Austrian network in 2005 along with Rádio Moçambique. The first protocol was Televisão Pública de Angola, TPA in 2002, followed by French networks TV5 Monde (in Memorandum of Understanding) and CFI in 2006 and TVI, Televisão Independente SA and RTP in 2007, with radio stations including Rádio Atlântico FM (broadcasting related to Cape Verde) in 2006 and Rádio Voz de Ponta d’Água in 2007.  One cooperation protocol was with a private university, Jean Piaget University of Cape Verde in 2006.

Programs
Other programs includes sports coverage of some of the clubs of each island, the top clubs including Sporting Clube da Praia, Boavista Praia, Académica da Praia, CS Mindelense, FC Derby, Académica do Sal, Académica do Porto Novo, Académica do Fogo and Sporting Clube do Porto Novo, many of the regional matches are broadcast locally on radio and television.  Almost every Cape Verdean Football Championships matches are aired on RCV and TCV, every championship semifinal and final matches, it once did with several national cup finals and super cup matches.  Also the basketball games are aired on RCV and TCV, it may have broadcasting volleyball games.

Its main television programs include Tribuna VIP (VIP Tribune) which includes sports highlights.

Each year, the network broadcasts parts of several music festivals including Praia da Gamboa in Santiago in April or May, Baía das Gatas in São Vicente in August and Santa Maria in the island of Sal in September.

List of programs
Regiões (Regions)
Tribuna VIP (VIP Tribune) - sports program

Coverage
With national coverage in open signal, RTC transmits in the city of Praia and other islands of the archipelago.  Here are a list of signals that cover in Cape Verde:

In the filming industry
The broadcasting station made a film with Spain's Útopi ASAD Animasur titled Kontinuasom which was released in 2009.

Presidents
Horácio Moreira Semedo (in 2008)
José Emanuel Tavares Moreira (current)

Communications staff
Júlio Rodrigues (director of television)
Anatólio Lima (director of radio)
Palo - soundman until 1989 at the radio station

Employees
Elisângelo Ramos - reporter for RCV radio network since 1996

See also
List of television stations in Africa
List of companies in Cape Verde

References

External links
Official website of the Radiotelevisão Caboverdiana
Official website of TCV 
Official website of RCV 

Radio stations in Cape Verde
Television stations in Cape Verde
Portuguese-language radio stations
Portuguese-language television networks
Radio stations established in 1997
Television channels and stations established in 1997
Mass media in Praia
1997 establishments in Cape Verde